Vladyslav Oleksandrovych Mudryk (born 17 January 2001) is a Ukrainian professional footballer who plays as a right-back for Ukrainian Premier League club Metalist Kharkiv.

References

External links
 
 

2001 births
Living people
People from Novovolynsk
Ukrainian footballers
Ukraine youth international footballers
Association football defenders
FC Karpaty Lviv players
Pogoń Lwów players
FC Olimpik Donetsk players
FC Metalist Kharkiv players
Ukrainian First League players
Ukrainian Second League players